China Press is a Malaysian Chinese-language newspaper set up by Henry Lee Hau Shik and first published on 1 February 1946 in Kuala Lumpur.

On 13 May 1969, China Press was suspended for a month following its publication of a court news item after the 13 May Incident.

China Press relaunched in 1986, and by 1988, its daily circulation had increased from 20,000 to 100,000, making it the fastest-growing paper in Malaysia. Today, its daily circulation of about 154,000 makes it the second best selling Chinese daily newspaper in Malaysia. Its Night edition paper is the most popular in Malaysia with a circulation of about 48,000. 

Due to its popularity in Malaysia, China Press launched their evening version on 19 May 1990 with the mission statement of Today News Tonight Know.

In 1993, Nanyang Press took over the management of China Press.

References

External links 
 

1946 establishments in British Malaya
Chinese-language mass media in Malaysia
Chinese-Malaysian culture in Kuala Lumpur
Newspapers published in Malaysia
Newspapers established in 1946
Mass media in Kuala Lumpur